The Baron of Mauá International Bridge is a bridge that crosses the Jaguarão River, linking the cities of Jaguarão, Rio Grande do Sul, Brazil and Río Branco, Uruguay.

Built between 1927 and 1930, it was named in honor of Irineu Evangelista de Souza, Baron and Viscount of Mauá, an important businessman and banker who developed activities in both countries during the 19th century.

References

Bridges in Brazil
Bridges in Uruguay
International bridges
Buildings and structures in Rio Grande do Sul
Buildings and structures in Cerro Largo Department
Bridges completed in 1930
Brazil–Uruguay border crossings
Jaguarão
1930 establishments in Brazil
1930 establishments in Uruguay